The Gibraltarians (also called Llanitos/as) are a cultural group or nation from the British overseas territory of Gibraltar.

The following is a list of notable Gibraltarians or people born in Gibraltar, listed in alphabetical order within categories:

Academics
Daniella Tilbury, university professor, CEO of the University of Gibraltar.
Alfred Hermida, media scholar, author and journalist who is a full professor and former director of the School of Journalism, Writing, and Media (2015-2020) at the University of British Columbia, and co-founder of The Conversation Canada.

Actors
Levy Attias (1924–2010), best known for his role as Juan Cervantes in the ITV British comedy series Mind Your Language
 Nicholas Boulton, actor. His extensive career has encompassed stage, screen, and radio. He has played leading and major supporting roles for many British stage productions including for the Royal Shakespeare Company.
Ava Addams (b. 1979), pornographic actress and erotic model of British descent.

Conductors
Karel Mark Chichon (b. 1971), chief conductor of the Graz Symphony Orchestra, conductor emeritus of the Latvian National Symphony Orchestra, principal conductor of the European Sinfonietta and artistic director of the Gibraltar Philharmonic Society

Musicians, bands

 Stuart Cavilla (b. 1973), former Breed 77 bassist
 Peter Chichone (b. 1968), former Breed 77 drummer
 Surianne Dalmedo, rock musician and vocalist
 Danny Felice, (b. 1965), former Breed 77 guitarist
 Albert Hammond (b. 1944), singer-songwriter
 Pedro Caparros Lopez, (b. 1975), former Breed 77 guitarist
 Paul Isola, (b. 1972), former Breed 77 vocalist
 Charles Ramirez (b. 1953), professor of guitar at the Royal College of Music
 Taxi, pop rock band

Painters
 Gustavo Bacarisas (1873–1971)
 Willa Vasquez Serfaty (b. 1954)
 Christian Hook (b. 1971)

Writers
 Henry Francis Cary (1772–1844), author and translator
 Mary Chiappe
 M. G. Sanchez
 Thomas Finlayson, historical researcher and author
 Cecil Street, British Army officer and writer of detective novels. Also wrote as John Rhode, Miles Burton and Cecil Waye
 Jane Clifton (b. 1949), Australian actress, singer, writer and voice artist

Designers
 John Galliano (b. 1960), four-time British fashion designer of the year, former head designer of Dior

Historians
 Sam Benady
 Tito Benady (b. 1930)
 Dorothy Ellicott
 Tommy Finlayson (b. 1938)
 George Palao
 Tito Vallejo
 Antonio Zinny (1821–1890), lawyer, journalist and historian. He was especially prominent as a popular historian of Argentina in the first half of the twentieth century and of the Governors of Argentine provinces, the first serious attempt to chronicle the history of the provinces of Argentina.

Media
 Thomas William Bowlby (1818–1860), correspondent for The Times in Germany and China
 Davina Camilleri, Gibraltar Broadcasting Corporation radio and television presenter
 Gerard Teuma, Gibraltar Broadcasting Corporation radio and television presenter
 Arthur Howes (1950–2004), was a documentary film maker and teacher.

Military officers
 James Henry Craig (1748–1812), British general and colonial administrator active during the Napoleonic Wars; led a successful expedition to capture the Dutch Cape Colony
 Alfred Holmes (1931–1994), sergeant of the Royal Gibraltar Regiment, Gibraltar Barbary macaques, Ape Keeper
 Frederick Stanley Maude KCB CMG DSO (1864–1917), Coldstream Guards General who led the successful campaign in World War I to capture Baghdad over the winter of 1917
 John Montresor (1736–1799), military engineer in the British service active in North America, whose amorous exploits inspired the best-selling novel Charlotte Temple
 William Rooke Creswell KCMG KBE (1855–1933), Vice Admiral, Australian naval officer, commonly considered to be the 'father' of the Royal Australian Navy
 Frederic Creswell DSO (1866–1948), Colonel South African Defence Force. Took part in Boer War and later commanded 8th South African Infantry in WW1. Later Minister of Defence of South Africa 1924–1933.
 Wallace Duffield Wright VC CB CMG DSO (1875–1953), Brigadier. British Army Officer Queen's Royal West Surrey Regiment, awarded the VC for his actions during the Kano-Sokoto Expedition. Elected MP Tavistock 1928–33.
 Edward Bell MC & Bar (1886–1918), Captain. Served in the Football Battalion: the 17th Battalion of the Middlesex Regiment. Footballer with Southampton, Portsmouth and Crystal Palace before WW1.
 James Richard Dacres (1788–1853), Vice-Admiral Royal Navy. Saw service during the Seven Years' War, the American War of Independence and the French Revolutionary and Napoleonic Wars.
 Rear Admiral Sir Home Riggs Popham, KCB, KCH (12 October 1762 – 20 September 1820), was a Royal Navy commander who saw service against the French during the Revolutionary and Napoleonic Wars. He is remembered for his scientific accomplishments, particularly the development of a signal code that was adopted by the Royal Navy in 1803.

Politicians

 Felix Alvarez (b. 1951), founder of the Equality Rights Group
 Keith Azopardi (b. 1967), former leader of the Progressive Democratic Party
 John Beikie (1766–1839), first clerk of the Executive Council of Upper Canada
 Joe Bossano (b. 1939), fourth Chief Minister of Gibraltar
 Adolfo Canepa (b. 1940), third Chief Minister of Gibraltar
 Peter Caruana QC (b. 1956), fifth Chief Minister of Gibraltar
 Daniel Feetham (b. 1967), Leader of the Opposition 
 Joseph Garcia PhD (b. 1967), leader of the Liberal Party of Gibraltar
 Charles Gomez (b. 1959), leader of the New Gibraltar Democracy
 Sir Joshua Hassan GBE KCMG LVO (1915–1997), first Chief Minister of Gibraltar
 Peter Isola (1929–2006), former leader of the Democratic Party of British Gibraltar
 Robert Peliza KBE (1920–2011), second Chief Minister of Gibraltar
 Fabian Picardo (b. 1972), sixth Chief Minister of Gibraltar
 Angela Smith, co-founder of the Gibraltar Women's Association
 Dr. Reggie Valarino (1941–2009), former member of the Gibraltar Democratic Movement
 Maurice Xiberras, first leader of the Democratic Party of British Gibraltar
 Frederic Creswell, Labour Party Politician South Africa. Minister of Defence 1924–1933.
 George Tierney (1761–1830), Anglo-Irish Whig politician

Religious

 Peter Emmanuel Amigo (1864–1949), Roman Catholic bishop in the Catholic Church in England and Wales
 Michael George Bowen (1930–2019), prelate of the Roman Catholic Church; served as Archbishop of Southwark and Bishop of Arundel and Brighton
 Charles Caruana (1932–2010), Roman Catholic Bishop of Gibraltar
 Bernard Devlin (1921–2010), Roman Catholic Bishop of Gibraltar
 Mark Miles, priest, Permanent Observer of the Holy See to the Organization of American States
 Edward Stevenson (1820–1897), prominent Mormon missionary and served as a General Authority in the Church of Jesus Christ of Latter-day Saints

Scientists
 Barry Azzopardi (b. 1947), chemical engineer specialising in multiphase flow research; Lady Trent Professor of Chemical Engineering at the University of Nottingham
 Clive Finlayson MBE (b. 1955), zoologist, paleoanthropologist and paleontologist; Director Chief Scientist and Curator at the Gibraltar Museum; Director of the Gorham's Cave Complex UNESCO World Heritage Site
 Geraldine Finlayson GA, managing director of the Gibraltar Museum
 William George Penney OM KBE (1909–1991), physicist responsible for the development of British nuclear technology following World War II

Sportspeople

 Ellie Allen, Irish rugby union footballer
 Allen Bula, football manager
 Ethan Britto, footballer 
 Jeremy Campbell-Lamerton, Scottish rugby union footballer
 Eva Carneiro, sports medicine specialist
 Amanda Carreras, tennis player
 Dominic Carroll, track and field athlete
 Kyle Casciaro, footballer
 Lee Casciaro, footballer
 Ryan Casciaro, footballer
 Georgina Cassar, rhythmic gymnast
 Joseph Chipolina, footballer
 Roy Chipolina, footballer
 Tjay De Barr, footballer
 Peter Dignan (1955–2013), rower 
 Dylan Duo (b. 1977), darts player
 Pepe Forbes (1917–2013), boxing matchmaker
 Danny Higginbotham, former footballer 
 Antony Lopez (b. 1987), darts player
 Tony Macedo (b. 1938), football goalkeeper (Fulham Football Club, 1957–1968)
 Dyson Parody (b. 1984), darts player
 Manuel Vilerio (b. 1967), darts player
 Liam Walker, footballer
 Henry Wheeler (1840–1908), cricketer
 Scott Wiseman, footballer
 Alison Nicholas MBE is an English professional golfer with 4 LPGA tour wins. 
 Arthur Forman (1850–1905), cricketer who played for Derbyshire between 1877 and 1882.

Various
 Kaiane Aldorino (b. 1986), Miss Gibraltar and Miss World 2009, incumbent Mayoress
 Aaron Cardozo, consul for Tunis and Algiers
 Maroua Kharbouch (b. 1990), Miss Gibraltar 2013
 David Pacifico (1784–1854), known as Don Pacifico, key figure in the international crisis known as the Don Pacifico affair
Mariola Summerfield (1927–2021), women's rights activist

People of Gibraltarian descent
 Dan Anahory (b. 1993), entrepreneur
 Imperio Argentina (1906–2003), singer and actress
 Reynaldo Bignone(1928–2018), Argentine general who served as 41st President of Argentina from 1 July 1982 to 10 December 1983. In 2010, he was sentenced to 25 years in prison for his role in the kidnapping, torture, and murder of persons suspected of opposing the government during the Dirty War.
 Jo Frost (b. 1970), nanny and TV personality
 Albert Hammond Jr. (b. 1980), guitarist
 Rita Hayworth (1918–1987), born Margarita Cansino, Hollywood actress
 Michelle Keegan (b. 1987), actress known for her roles as Tina McIntyre in the ITV soap opera Coronation Street and Corporal Georgie Lane in the BBC drama series Our Girl.

People born in Gibraltar during the Spanish period
Prior to its capture in 1704 by the British, there were 4,000 inhabitants of Gibraltar, all but 70 of whom fled to the surrounding Campo de Gibraltar. Some notable people born in Gibraltar prior to British rule include:

 Diego de Astorga y Céspedes (1663–1734), Catholic Archbishop of Toledo and Grand Inquisitor
 Alonso Hernández del Portillo (1543–1624), first historian of Gibraltar
 Juan Mateos (?–1594), founder of Gibraltar's first hospital
 Gonzalo Piña Ludueña (1545–1600), Spanish conquistador in Venezuela; founder of Venezuelan town of San Antonio de Gibraltar in 1592
 Juan Romero de Figueroa (1646–1720), Spanish Catholic priest in charge of the church of St. Mary the Crowned when the town was captured in 1704
 Simón Susarte, Spanish goatherd who guided a Spanish contingent over the Rock in the 1704 Franco-Spanish siege

People of Gibraltar descent (prior to British rule)
Luis Daoíz (1767–1808), one of the heroes of the Dos de Mayo Uprising

See also
 Demographics of Gibraltar
 Gibraltarians
 Gibraltarian status
 History of nationality in Gibraltar

References

 
Lists of people by nationality
Lists of people by ethnicity
 
Lists of people from British Overseas Territories